The Atlas of Peculiar Galaxies is a catalog of peculiar galaxies produced by Halton Arp in 1966. A total of 338 galaxies are presented in the atlas, which was originally published in 1966 by the California Institute of Technology. The primary goal of the catalog was to present photographs of examples of the different kinds of peculiar structures found among galaxies.

Background
Arp realized that the reason why galaxies formed into spiral or elliptical shapes was not well understood. He perceived peculiar galaxies as small "experiments" that astronomers could use to understand the physical processes that distort spiral or elliptical galaxies. With this atlas, astronomers had a sample of peculiar galaxies that they could study in more detail. The atlas does not present a complete overview of every peculiar galaxy in the sky but instead provides examples of the different phenomena as observed in nearby galaxies.

Because little was known at the time of publication about the physical processes that caused the different shapes, the galaxies in the atlas are sorted based on their appearance. Objects 1–101 are individual peculiar spiral galaxies or spiral galaxies that apparently have small companions.  Objects 102–145 are elliptical and elliptical-like galaxies. Individual or groups of galaxies with neither elliptical nor spiral shapes are listed as objects 146–268. Objects 269–327 are double galaxies. Finally, objects that simply do not fit into any of the above categories are listed as objects 332–338. Most objects are best known by their other designations, but a few galaxies are best known by their Arp numbers (such as Arp 220).

Today, the physical processes that lead to the peculiarities seen in the Arp atlas are thought to be well understood. A large number of the objects have been interpreted as interacting galaxies, including M51 (Arp 85), Arp 220, and the Antennae Galaxies (NGC 4038/NGC 4039, or Arp 244). A few of the galaxies are simply dwarf galaxies that do not have enough mass to produce enough gravity to allow the galaxies to form any cohesive structure. NGC 1569 (Arp 210) is an example of one of the dwarf galaxies in the atlas. A few other galaxies are radio galaxies. These objects contain active galactic nuclei that produce powerful jets of gas called radio jets. The atlas includes the nearby radio galaxies M87 (Arp 152) and Centaurus A (Arp 153).

The peculiar associations present in the catalogue are now interpreted as galaxy mergers or non-interacting line-of-sight overlap, though Arp disputed that idea, claiming that apparent associations were examples of ejections.

Notable Arp galaxies

Catalog list

Spiral galaxies

Low surface brightness

These are mostly dwarf galaxies or poorly defined spiral galaxies (with the designation Sm) that have low surface brightnesses (i.e. they emit little light per unit area). Low surface brightness galaxies are actually quite common. The exception is NGC 2857 (Arp 1), which is an Sc spiral galaxy (which means that it has a definite structure with loosely wound spiral arms and a faint but well-defined nucleus).

Split arms
This category contains spiral galaxies with arms that split into two separate parts.

Detached segments

This category contains spiral galaxies with arms that appear to be segmented. Some spiral arm segments may appear detached because dust lanes in the spiral arms obscure the arms' starlight. Other spiral arms may appear segmented because of the presence of bright star clusters (or discontinuous chains of bright star clusters) in the spiral arms.

Three-armed
Usually, most spiral galaxies contain two clearly defined spiral arms, or they contain only fuzzy filamentary spiral structures. Galaxies with three well-defined spiral arms are rare.

One-armed

One-armed spiral galaxies, including Magellanic spirals, are also rare. In this case, the single spiral arm may actually be formed by a gravitational interaction with another galaxy (as with the Large Magellanic Cloud itself, although it is not a member of the catalog).

One heavy arm 

The spiral arms in these galaxies have an asymmetric appearance. One spiral arm may appear to be considerably brighter than the other. In the photographic plates produced by Arp, the bright arm would look dark or "heavy". While most of these galaxies (such as M101 and NGC 6946) are simply asymmetric spiral galaxies, NGC 6365 is an interacting pair of galaxies where one of the two galaxies is viewed edge-on and just happens to lie where the spiral arm for the other face-on galaxy would be visible.

Integral sign
These are galaxies that look like a stretched-out S shape (or like the integral sign used in calculus). Some objects, such as IC 167, are simply ordinary spiral galaxies viewed from an unusual angle. Other objects, such as UGC 10770, are interacting pairs of galaxies with tidal tails that look similar to spiral arms.

Low surface brightness companions

Many of these spiral galaxies are probably interacting with the low surface brightness galaxies in the field of view. In some cases, however, it may be difficult to determine whether the companion is physically near the spiral galaxy or whether the companion is a foreground/background source or a source on the edge of the spiral galaxy.

Small, high surface brightness companions

Again, many of these spiral galaxies are probably interacting with companion galaxies, although some of the identified companion galaxies may be foreground/background sources or even bright star clusters within the individual galaxies.

Large, high surface brightness companions

Galaxies in this category are almost always clearly interacting sources. The most famous of these objects is the Whirlpool Galaxy (M51; Arp 85), which is composed of a spiral galaxy NGC 5194 that is interacting with a smaller elliptical galaxy NGC 5195. The interaction has distorted the shape of both galaxies; the spiral arm pattern has been enhanced in the larger spiral galaxy, and a bridge of stars and gas has formed between the two galaxies. Many of the other galaxies in this category are also connected by bridges.

Elliptical companions

Like the spiral galaxies with high surface brightness companions, most of these spiral galaxies are clearly interacting systems. Tidal tails and bridges are visible in many of the images.

Elliptical and elliptical-like galaxies

Connected to spiral galaxies

These objects are very similar to the spiral galaxies with elliptical companions. All of the galaxies have features such as tidal tails and tidal bridges that have formed through gravitational interaction.

Repelling spiral arms
Based on the description of these objects, it appears that Arp originally thought that the elliptical galaxies were pushing away spiral arms in companion galaxies. However, the tidal spiral arms may actually look distorted because of the interaction. Some of these "repelled" spiral arms are on the opposite side of the spiral galaxy from the elliptical galaxy. Simulations have shown that such features can be formed through gravitational interactions alone; no repelling forces are needed.

Close to and perturbing spiral galaxies

This is another category in which the majority of objects are interacting galaxies. As noted in the category name, the spiral galaxies look perturbed. Arp originally described some of the elliptical galaxies as repelling.

Nearby fragments

Emanating material
Arp thought that the elliptical galaxies in this category were ejecting material from their nuclei. Many of the pictures could be interpreted that way. However, these objects are actually a mixture of other phenomena. For example, NGC 2914 (Arp 137) is merely a spiral galaxy with faint spiral arms, and NGC 4015 (Arp 138) is an interacting pair of galaxies where one galaxy is an edge-on spiral galaxy. Some objects, such as NGC 2444 and NGC 2445 (Arp 143), are systems that contain "ring galaxies", which are created when one galaxy (the elliptical galaxies in these examples) passes through the disk of another. This passage causes a gravitational wave in which gas first falls inward and then propagates outward to form the ring structure.

Amorphous galaxies
Galaxies in this category are referred to by Arp as galaxies that are neither spiral nor elliptical in shape. Although he does not use the term "amorphous" to describe these galaxies, it is the best description of these galaxies.

Many of these galaxies are either interacting galaxies or galaxies that are the remnants of the merger of two smaller galaxies. The interaction process will produce various tidal features, such as tidal tails and tidal bridges, that may last well after the progenitor galaxies' disks and nuclei have merged. Although the tidal tails are described as several different visual phenomena ("counter-tails", "filaments", "loops"), they are all manifestations of the same phenomena.

Associated rings

As noted above, these ring galaxies may have formed when a companion galaxy passed through the ring galaxy. The interaction would produce a wave effect that would first draw matter into the center and then cause it to propagate outward in a ring.

Jets

These are galaxies that appear to be ejecting material outwards from their nuclei. The "jets" themselves look similar to water spraying out of a hose. In the case of IC 803 (Arp 149) and NGC 7609 (Arp 150), the jets are simply part of the amorphous structure produced by the interacting galaxies. In Arp 151 and Messier 87 (Arp 152), however, the jets are ionized gas that has been ejected from the environment around supermassive black holes in the galaxies' active galactic nuclei. These jets, sometimes called relativistic jets or radio jets, are powerful sources of synchrotron radiation, especially at radio wavelengths.

Interior absorption

Galaxies in this category feature dark dust lanes that obscure part of the disk of the galaxy. All of these galaxies are the products of two galaxies merging. NGC 520 (Arp 157) is one of the best examples of an intermediate-stage merger, where the two progenitor galaxies' disks have coalesced together but the nuclei have not. Centaurus A (Arp 153) and NGC 1316 (Arp 154) are both effectively elliptical galaxies with unusual dust lanes; their kinematics and structure indicate that they have undergone merging events recently. NGC 4747 (Arp 159) may be nothing more than an edge-on spiral galaxy with a significantly dark dust lanes.

Diffuse filaments
The filaments in these objects may represent tidal tails from galaxy interactions. Many of the galaxies are the remnants of the mergers of two spiral galaxies to form a single elliptical galaxy. However, NGC 3414 (Arp 162) appears to be merely an unusual S0 galaxy with a very small disk relative to its bulge size. NGC 4670 (Arp 163) is a blue compact dwarf galaxy with extremely strong star formation activity; it is clearly too small to be the merger remnant of two spiral galaxies like the other merger remnants in this sample, although it may have been involved in a much smaller interaction.

Diffuse counter-tails
All of these objects are galaxies involved in gravitational interactions. These counter-tails are tidal features caused by the gravitational interactions between two galaxies, just like similar features described in the Arp catalog. Messier 32 (Arp 168), a dwarf galaxy interacting with the Andromeda Galaxy, is included in this category (although the "diffuse counter-tail" is very difficult to see in Arp's photograph).

Narrow counter-tails
This is another category containing galaxies with tidal tails produced by gravitational interactions. These tidal tails are narrower and better defined than the tidal tails in objects 167–172.

Narrow filaments

This category contains a mixture of different types of objects. Like the galaxies with diffuse filaments or galaxies with counter-tails, some of the galaxies in this category have been involved in interactions, and the filaments are tidal features created by those interactions. Other sources, however, are simply individual spiral galaxies with faint spiral arms that are described as "filaments" by Arp.

Material ejected from nuclei

The ejecta in many of these objects appear to be tidal features created by gravitational interactions. In some cases (such as for NGC 5544 and NGC 5545 in Arp 199), the "ejecta" are clearly a spiral galaxy viewed edge-on that happens to line up with another galaxy's nucleus.

Almost all of the objects in this category are interacting or have recently undergone interactions. NGC 3712 (Arp 203) is an exception; it is merely a low surface brightness spiral galaxy.

Irregularities, absorption, and resolution

Galaxies in this category have either irregular structures (irregularities), notable dust lanes (absorption), or a grainy appearance (resolution). This category contains a mix of interacting galaxies distorted by tidal interactions, nearby dwarf irregular galaxies, and spiral galaxies with unusual large amounts of gas.

Adjacent loops

These adjacent loops are another manifestation of the structures formed by gravitational interactions between galaxies. Some of these sources consist of galaxies that have nearly completed the merger process; the "adjacent loops" are merely the remnants of the interaction. Among the objects in this category is Arp 220, one of the best-studied ultraluminous infrared galaxies in the sky.

Amorphous spiral arms

Many of these galaxies are merger remnants. The "amorphous spiral arms" are the tidal debris that remains after the collision.

Concentric rings

These are galaxies with shell-like structures. Some shell structures have been identified as the results of recent mergers. In other cases, however, the shell structure may represent the outer disk of an S0 galaxy. In some complicated cases, the galaxy with the rings or shells is an S0 galaxy interacting with another galaxy; the origins of the shells in such systems can be difficult to determine.

Appearance of fission

Although the description of the objects in this category implies that the galaxies are separating, most of these galaxies are merging. Many of the objects have very pronounced tidal tails and bridges that have formed as a consequence of the interaction. Most objects are in the early stages of the merging process, where the galaxies still appear to have distinct nuclei and distinct (albeit distorted) disks. Among the most notable galaxies in this category are the Antennae Galaxies (NGC 4038 and NGC 4039, Arp 244) and the Mice Galaxies (NGC 4676, Arp 242).

However, not all of these objects are interacting galaxies. A few of these galaxies are simply nearby dwarf galaxies with irregular structure.

Irregular clumps

These are objects that appear to be a series of irregular clumps with no coherent structure. Many of these objects are simply nearby dwarf galaxies. Some of these objects are interacting galaxies, while others are small groups of galaxies. In both cases, many of the constituent galaxies are irregular galaxies. The superposition of two or more such irregular galaxies can easily look like a single larger irregular galaxy, which is why the Atlas of Peculiar Galaxies (and other catalogs) often classify these pairs and groups as single objects.

Double and multiple galaxies
Arp originally referred to these galaxies as "double galaxies", but many of these sources are more than two galaxies. Some of the objects consist of interacting galaxies, whereas other sources are actually groups of galaxies. The difference is that interacting galaxies will be distorted, whereas galaxies in groups are simply gravitationally bound to each other but not necessarily close enough to each other to induce major structural changes.

Connected arms

All of these galaxies are interacting pairs of galaxies except for NGC 5679 (Arp 274), which may be an interacting galaxy triplet.
The connected arms described here are tidal bridge features that form between interacting galaxies. These bridges form early during galaxy interactions.

Interacting galaxies

Unlike many of the objects listed in the amorphous galaxies section, the interacting galaxies that comprise these objects are still distinguishable from each other.

Infall and attraction

This category contains an odd mixture of objects. Two of the objects are edge-on disk galaxies with smaller companion galaxies nearby. Two of the objects are connected by tidal bridges. The last two objects may simply be interacting with each other over long distance.

Wind effects

Although included in the double galaxies category, many of these objects are individual galaxies. The "wind effects" refer to the appearance, not the actual detection of high-velocity gas (such as is found in M82). In some cases, the appearance may be the result of interaction. In other cases, particularly NGC 3981 (Arp 289), the faint, extended emission may be related to the intrinsic nature of the galaxy itself and not interactions with other objects.

Long filaments

The long filaments in these systems are probably tidal tails or bridges that have been produced as the result of the gravitational interaction between the galaxies.

Unclassified objects

Arp did not give a subclassification for objects 298–310 in his atlas. These objects are mostly interacting galaxy pairs.

Groups

Chains

Miscellaneous

Brightest Arp galaxies for amateur astronomers
Maynard Pittendreigh, an amateur astronomer and occasional writer, has compiled a list of the brightest Arp Galaxies that are most easily viewed by typical amateur astronomers. The galaxies on the list can be observed visually and do not require special photographic or imaging equipment.  These include:

See also
Index Catalogue (IC)
Messier object (M)
New General Catalogue (NGC)
Uppsala General Catalogue (UGC)

Further reading
 J. Kanipe, D. Webb The Arp Atlas of Peculiar Galaxies, A Chronicle and Observer's Guide, Willmann-Bell Inc. (2006)

References
Atlas of Peculiar Galaxies courtesy of the NASA/IPAC Extragalactic Database. Retrieved on 2006-07-03, 2006-07-12, 2006-07-14, 2006-07-16, 2006-07-17, 2006-07-18, 2006-07-19, 2006-07-20, 2006-07-24, 2006-07-25, 2006-07-26, 2006-07-27, 2006-07-31, 2006-08-02, 2006-08-08, 2006-08-10, 2006-08-13.
NASA/IPAC Extragalactic Database General information retrieval on individual Arp objects. Retrieved on 2006-07-03, 2006-07-12, 2006-07-14, 2006-07-16, 2006-07-17, 2006-07-18, 2006-07-19, 2006-07-20, 2006-07-24, 2006-07-25, 2006-07-26, 2006-07-27, 2006-07-31, 2006-08-02, 2006-08-08, 2006-08-10, 2006-08-13.

External links

 Arp's Catalog of Peculiar Galaxies website

Notes

 
Astronomical catalogues of galaxies